Alsine may refer to:
 Alsine Linnaeus, 1753, a genus of plants in the family Caryophyllaceae, synonym of Stellaria
 Alsine Gaertn., a genus of plants in the family Caryophyllaceae, synonym of Minuartia
 Alsine, a Dean of Canterbury, incumbent in 935